Mitsutarō, Mitsutaro or Mitsutarou (written: 光太郎) is a masculine Japanese given name. Notable people with the name include:

, Japanese photographer
, Japanese plant pathologist, mycologist and herbalist

Japanese masculine given names